
Year 319 (CCCXIX) was a common year starting on Thursday (link will display the full calendar) of the Julian calendar. At the time, it was known as the Year of the Consulship of Constantinus and Licinius (or, less frequently, year 1072 Ab urbe condita). The denomination 319 for this year has been used since the early medieval period, when the Anno Domini calendar era became the prevalent method in Europe for naming years.

Events 
 By place 
 Roman Empire 
 Emperor Constantine the Great prohibits the separation of the families of slaves, during a change in ownership.

 India 
 King Chandragupta I succeeds his father Ghatotkacha, as ruler of the Gupta Empire.

 Georgia 
 Christianity is introduced in Colchis, present-day Georgia.

 By topic 
 Religion 
 Arius travels to Nicomedia at the invitation of Bishop Eusebius, after having been accused of heresy and condemned by Alexander, the Patriarch of Alexandria. This gives rise to the Arian Controversy.

Births 
 Murong Jun, Chinese emperor of the Former Yan (d. 360)

Deaths 
 Du Zeng, Chinese general and rebel leader
 Ghatotkacha, Indian ruler of the Gupta Empire
 Theodore Stratelates, Greek general and martyr (b. 281)

References